Lexington Senior High School is a public high school in Lexington, North Carolina, United States.

Demographics
In 2011, using federal government guidelines, 69% of the students were eligible for free or reduced-price lunches.

Spending
The Lexington City Schools spends $8,631 per pupil based on 2011 expenditures. The district spends 62% on instruction, 32% on support services, 6% on other elementary and secondary expenditures.

Athletics
Lexington school mascot is the Yellow Jacket. They are members of the North Carolina High School Athletic Association (NCHSAA). Listed below are sports teams accomplishments:

 NCHSAA State 2A Football Champions: 1985, 1986
 NCHSAA State 2A Basketball Champions: 1988, 1995
 NCHSAA State 1A/2A Men's Tennis Team Champions: 1986, 1987
 NCHSAA State Men's Tennis Doubles Champions: 1925
 NCHSAA State 1A/2A Men's Tennis Doubles Champions: 1987
 NCHSAA State 2A Men's Tennis Doubles Champions: 2001
 NCHSAA State 3A Men's Tennis Doubles Champions: 1993 
 NCHSAA State Women's 4x100 Relay Champions: 1986, 1987, 1989, 2019, 2021
 NCHSAA State Women's 4x200 Relay Champions: 1989, 1991, 2021
 NCHSAA State Men's 4x100 Relay Champions: 2000, 2001, 2002
 NCHSAA State Men's 4x200 Relay Champions: 1989, 2001

Notable alumni
Bill Bailey, former NFL player
Richard Benjamin Harrison Jr., businessman and reality television personality, best known as co-owner of the World Famous Gold & Silver Pawn Shop as featured on Pawn Stars
Deems May, former NFL tight end
Joe McIntosh, former NFL running back
Harvey Cloyd Philpott, businessman and politician
David Rice, 15th Anglican Bishop of Waiapu
John Skipper, television executive, current executive chairman of DAZAN Group and former president of ESPN
William Caskey Swaim, television and film actor
Carlos Terry, NBA player
Rick Terry, former NFL defensive tackle

References

External links
 

Educational institutions in the United States with year of establishment missing
Public high schools in North Carolina
Schools in Davidson County, North Carolina